Gasp is a German-Taiwanese short film drama written and directed by Eicke Bettinga. The film premiered in the Official Selection at the 2012 Cannes Film Festival where it was nominated for the Short Film Palme d'Or.

Plot
It's the story about a teenager who only has one wish: to feel something - anything. One day he pushes his longing to the limit.

Critical reception 
"Eicke Bettinga touches on the big, abstract themes of solidarity, of human connection, of isolation, numbness and sacrifice."— Cannes Nisimazine

References

External links 
 
 GASP at the 65th Cannes Film Festival
 Watch the film on Amazon (official release)
 Official Fanpage on Facebook

2012 films
2012 short films
2012 drama films
German drama short films
2010s German-language films
2010s German films